Fairview (CDP) is in Lincoln County, Wyoming, United States. The population was 275 at the 2010 census.

History
The first settlement at Fairview was made in 1885. A post office called Fairview has been in operation since 1889.  The community was so named on account of scenic views from the elevated townsite.

Geography
Fairview is located at  (42.689133, -110.988496).

According to the United States Census Bureau, the CDP has a total area of 2.8 square miles (7.2 km2), all land.

Demographics
As of the census of 2000, there were 277 people, 81 households, and 63 families residing in the CDP. The population density was 99.8 people per square mile (38.6/km2). There were 91 housing units at an average density of 32.8/sq mi (12.7/km2). The racial makeup of the CDP was 99.64% White and 0.36% Asian. Hispanic or Latino of any race were 1.81% of the population.

There were 81 households, out of which 56.8% had children under the age of 18 living with them, 72.8% were married couples living together, 6.2% had a female householder with no husband present, and 21.0% were non-families. 11.1% of all households were made up of individuals, and 7.4% had someone living alone who was 65 years of age or older. The average household size was 3.42 and the average family size was 3.92.

In the CDP, the population was spread out, with 41.5% under the age of 18, 7.6% from 18 to 24, 27.8% from 25 to 44, 15.5% from 45 to 64, and 7.6% who were 65 years of age or older. The median age was 26 years. For every 100 females, there were 92.4 males. For every 100 females age 18 and over, there were 100.0 males.

The median income for a household in the CDP was $35,568, and the median income for a family was $36,477. Males had a median income of $34,750 versus $20,313 for females. The per capita income for the CDP was $8,322. About 14.0% of families and 14.1% of the population were below the poverty line, including 16.4% of those under the age of eighteen and none of those 65 or over.

Education
Public education in the community of Fairview is provided by Lincoln County School District #2.

References

Census-designated places in Lincoln County, Wyoming
Census-designated places in Wyoming